Warren County is a county located in the southwestern part of the U.S. state of Ohio. As of the 2020 census, the population was 242,337. Its county seat is Lebanon. The county is one of Ohio’s most affluent, with the county median income the highest of Ohio’s 88 counties. The county was established on May 1, 1803 from Hamilton County; it is named for Dr. Joseph Warren, a hero of the Revolution who sent Paul Revere and the overlooked William Dawes on their famous rides and who died at the Battle of Bunker Hill. Warren County is part of the Cincinnati, OH-KY-IN Metropolitan Statistical Area.

History
Warren County was established in 1803. The first non-Native American settlers were migrants from New England.  During the election of 1860 Abraham Lincoln received 60% of the vote in Warren County, and in 1864 he was reelected with 70% of the vote in the county.  From that time on the county was a stronghold of the Republican party, with Ulysses S. Grant going on to carry the county by large margins in both 1868 and 1872.

Geography
The county is a rough square with the sides roughly 20 miles (30 km) long.

Adjacent counties
 Montgomery County (northwest)
 Greene County (northeast)
 Clinton County (east)
 Clermont County (south)
 Hamilton County (southwest)
 Butler County (west)

Boundaries
Warren County was created by the first Ohio General Assembly in the Act of March 24, 1803, which also created Butler and Montgomery Counties. The act defined Warren County as "all that part of the county of Hamilton included within the following bounds, viz.: Beginning at the northeast corner of the county of Clermont, running thence west with the line of said county to the Little Miami; thence up the same with the meanders thereof to the north boundary of the first tier of sections in the second entire range of townships in the Miami Purchase; thence west to the northeast corner of Section No. 7 in the third township of the aforesaid range; thence north to the Great Miami; thence up the same to the middle of the fifth range of townships; thence east to the County line; thence with same south to the place of beginning." Originally this included land now in Clinton County as far east as Wilmington.

Clinton County proved a continuing headache to the legislature. The Ohio Constitution requires that every county have an area of at least four hundred square miles (1,036 km2). Clinton County's boundaries were several times adjusted in an effort to comply with that clause of the constitution. One of them, the Act of January 30, 1815, detached a strip of land from the eastern side to give to Clinton. That would have left Warren under four hundred square miles (1,036 km2), so a portion of Butler County (the part of Franklin Township where Carlisle is now located) was attached to Warren in compensation. The 1815 act was as follows:
 Section 1—That all that part of the county of Butler lying and being within the first and second fractional townships in the fifth range, and adjoining the south line of Montgomery County, shall be and the same is hereby attached to and made part of the county of Warren.
 Section 2—That eleven square miles 28 km2 of the territory of the county of Warren and extending parallel to the said eastern boundary of Warren County, along the whole length of such eastern boundary from north to south, shall be and the same is hereby attached to and made a part of the county of Clinton."
Except for the sections formed by the Great and Little Miamis, the sides are all straight lines.

Lakes and rivers
The major rivers of the county are the Great Miami River, which flows through the northwest corner of the county in Franklin Township, and the Little Miami River which zig-zags across the county from north to south. There is one sizable lake, the Caesars Creek Reservoir, created by a U.S. Army Corps of Engineers dam on Caesars Creek in the northeast part of the county in Massie Township.

Demographics

2000 census
As of the census of 2000, there were 158,383 people, 55,966 households, and 43,261 families residing in the county. The racial makeup of the county was 94.66% White, 2.73% Black or African American, 0.18% Native American, 1.26% Asian, 0.03% Pacific Islander, 0.31% from other races, and 0.84% from two or more races. Hispanic or Latino of any race were 1.03% of the population.

There were 55,966 households, out of which 39.70% had children under the age of 18 living with them, 66.20% were married couples living together, 8.00% had a female householder with no husband present, and 22.70% were non-families. 18.90% of all households were made up of individuals, and 6.40% had someone living alone who was 65 years of age or older. The average household size was 2.72 and the average family size was 3.12.

In the county, the population was spread out, with 27.70% under the age of 18, 7.10% from 18 to 24, 34.00% from 25 to 44, 21.80% from 45 to 64, and 9.40% who were 65 years of age or older. The median age was 35 years. For every 100 females there were 102.60 males. For every 100 females age 18 and over, there were 102.40 males.

The median income for a household in the county was $57,952, and the median income for a family was $64,692. Males had a median income of $47,027 versus $30,862 for females. The per capita income for the county was $25,517. About 3.00% of families and 4.20% of the population were below the poverty line, including 4.40% of those under age 18 and 4.70% of those age 65 or over.

2010 census
As of the 2010 United States Census, there were 212,693 people, 76,424 households, and 57,621 families residing in the county. The racial makeup of the county was 90.5% white, 3.9% Asian, 3.3% black or African American, 0.2% American Indian, 0.7% from other races, and 1.5% from two or more races. Those of Hispanic or Latino origin made up 2.2% of the population. In terms of ancestry, 28.7% were German, 14.1% were Irish, 12.0% were English, 11.6% were American, and 5.0% were Italian.

Of the 76,424 households, 40.1% had children under the age of 18 living with them, 62.6% were married couples living together, 8.8% had a female householder with no husband present, 24.6% were non-families, and 20.4% of all households were made up of individuals. The average household size was 2.70 and the average family size was 3.14. The median age was 37.8 years.

The median income for a household in the county was $71,274 and the median income for a family was $82,090. Males had a median income of $61,091 versus $41,331 for females. The per capita income for the county was $31,935. About 4.7% of families and 6.0% of the population were below the poverty line, including 7.6% of those under age 18 and 5.2% of those age 65 or over.

Economy
Warren County is home to the Mason Business Center, a  research and development facility for Procter and Gamble (P&G), whose global headquarters are located in downtown Cincinnati. 
 Originally built in 1995 after three years of construction, P&G recently completed expansion of a new  Beauty and Innovation Center in 2019, adding an additional 1,000 jobs for a total of 2,800 employees at the site. Mason is also home to the corporate headquarters of LensCrafters.

Top employers
According to the county's 2019 Comprehensive Annual Financial Report, the top employers in the county are:

Government and infrastructure
Warren County has a 3-member Board of County Commissioners that administer and oversee the various County departments, similar to all but 2 of the 88 Ohio counties. The original county commissioners in 1804 were Robert Benham, Matthias Corwin and William James. The elected commissioners now serve four-year terms. Warren County's current elected commissioners are:
 County Commissioners: Tom Grossmann (R), Shannon Jones (R), and David Young (R).

Hospitals
 Atrium Medical Center – Middletown (Formerly Middletown Regional Hospital)
 Bethesda Medical Center at Arrow Springs – Lebanon (Branch of Bethesda North Hospital)

Post offices
The following post offices, with ZIP codes, serve Warren County:

 Blanchester, 45107
 Carlisle, 45005
 Cincinnati (Sharonville branch), 45241
 Cincinnati (Symmes branch), 45249
 Clarksville, 45113
 Dayton (Centerville/Washington Twp. branch), 45458
 Franklin, 45005
 Harveysburg, 45032
 Goshen, 45122
 Kings Mills, 45034
 Lebanon, 45036
 Loveland, 45140
 Maineville, 45039
 Mason, 45040
 Miamisburg, 45342
 Middletown, 45044
 Monroe, 45050
 Morrow, 45152
 Oregonia, 45054
 Pleasant Plain, 45162
 South Lebanon, 45065
 Springboro,45066
 Waynesville, 45068

Telephone service
These are the telephone companies serving Warren County: CenturyLink (CL); FairPoint Communications (FP); Cincinnati Bell (Cin); AT&T (AT&T); TDS Telecom (TDS); and Frontier Communications (F). Warren County is in the 513 and 937 area codes.

The following exchange areas serve Warren County, listed with the area code and incumbent local exchange carrier (ILEC) abbreviation from above serving that exchange (list may not be up-to-date):
 Bellbrook (937-AT&T): 310, 661, 848
 Blanchester (937-F): 783
 Butlerville (513-TDS): 877
 Centerville (937-AT&T): 350, 619, 885, 886
 Clarksville (937-F): 289, 501, 574, 577
 Franklin (937-AT&T): 514, 550, 557, 704, 743, 746, 748, 790, 806, 928
 Germantown (937-FP): 855
 Lebanon (513-CL): 228, 282, 331, 695, 696, 836, 850, 932, 933, 934
 Little Miami (513-Cin): 239, 248, 274, 334, 340, 444, 453, 575, 576, 583, 600, 677, 683, 697, 707, 716, 722, 774, 831, 833, 965
 Mason (513-CL): 336, 339, 398, 459, 492, 573, 622, 754, 229, 234, 701, 770
 Miamisburg-West Carrollton (937-AT&T): 247, 353, 384, 388, 530, 560, 847, 859, 865, 866, 914
 Middletown (513-AT&T): 217, 222, 224, 261, 267, 292, 306, 318, 320, 355, 392, 420, 422, 423, 424, 425, 433, 435, 464, 465, 571, 594, 649, 705, 727, 783, 804, 849, 890, 915
 Monroe (513-AT&T): 360, 539
 Morrow (513-CL): 899
 New Burlington (937-F): 488
 South Lebanon (513-CL): 268, 480, 494
 Spring Valley (937-AT&T): 317, 659, 862
 Springboro (937-AT&T): 743, 746, 748, 885, 886 - (513-CL): 902, 915, 956
 Waynesville (513-CL): 897

Politics
Warren County has long been one of the most Republican counties in Ohio, and has been since the party was established in the 1850s. Since the first presidential election after its founding, 1856, Warren County has supported the Republican candidate for president all but once, the exception being 1964 when Warren County voted for Democrat Lyndon B. Johnson over Barry M. Goldwater. In 2008, Warren County cast the largest net vote for John McCain of any Ohio county. Before the Republican Party was formed, Warren County supported the Whigs.

The Republican trend is no less pronounced at the state level. Since 1869, Warren County has almost always supported the Republican candidate for Governor of Ohio, the exceptions being in 1924 when it supported Vic Donahey, 1932 (George White), 1952 (Frank Lausche), and 1958 (Michael V. DiSalle). However, other than DiSalle, each of these four Democrats, who were all victorious statewide, were conservative Democrats.

In local races, Warren County occasionally elected Democrats for much of the 20th century. In 1976, two of the three county commission seats were won by Democrats, and as late as the 1990s, local elections between Democrats and Republicans frequently remained competitive.  However, with the massive expansion of Warren County's population in the 1990s, the county swiftly became a Republican stronghold, this being indicated by the fact that Republicans' typically ran unopposed. In elections between 1996 and 2012, in which eight county offices were on the ballot, no Democrat filed to run. In November 1999, the last elected Democrat to hold office in Warren County, a member of the Educational Service Center (county school board), lost her seat to a Republican.

|}

Education

Public school districts
 Blanchester City School District (also in Brown, Clermont, and Clinton)
 Carlisle Local School District (also in Montgomery)
 Carlisle High School, Carlisle (the Indians)
 Clinton-Massie Local School District (also in Clinton)
 Franklin City School District
 Franklin High School, Franklin (the Wildcats)
 Goshen Local School District (also in Clermont)
 Kings Local School District
 Kings High School, Kings Mills (the Knights)
 Lebanon City School District
 Lebanon High School, Lebanon (the Warriors)
 Little Miami Local School District (also in Clermont)
 Little Miami High School, Morrow (the Panthers)
 Loveland City School District (also in Clermont and Hamilton)
 Mason City School District
 William Mason High School, Mason (the Comets)
 Middletown City School District (also in Butler)
 Monroe Local School District (also in Butler)
 Princeton City School District (also in Butler and Hamilton)
 Springboro Community City School District (also in Montgomery)
 Springboro High School, Springboro (the Panthers)
 Wayne Local School District
 Waynesville High School, Waynesville (the Spartans)
 Warren County Vocational School District
 Warren County Career Center, Lebanon
 Xenia City School District (also in Greene and Clinton)

Private schools
 Bishop Fenwick High School – Franklin
 Lebanon Christian School – Lebanon
 Mars Hill Academy - Mason
 Middletown Christian Schools – Franklin
 St. Margaret of York School – Loveland
 Liberty Bible Academy – Mason
 St. Susanna Parish School – Mason
 Royalmont Academy – Mason
 St. Francis de Sales – Lebanon
 CinDay Academy - Springboro

Virtual schools
 Warren County Virtual Community School

Vocational schools
 Warren County Career Center Website

Colleges and universities
Warren County has no native colleges or universities, but was the original site selected for Miami University which instead located in Oxford, Ohio in 1809. National Normal University, a teachers college, was in Lebanon from 1855 until 1917 when it closed. Several colleges offer classes in Warren County at various locations, including Sinclair Community College of Dayton, the University of Cincinnati, and Wilmington College. Sinclair opened a branch in the Mason area in 2007. The University of Cincinnati owns  of land at the intersections of I-71 and Wilmington road, but no plans for development on the site have been announced.

Libraries
The county has six public libraries:
 Franklin Public Library - Franklin
 Lebanon Public Library - Lebanon
 Mary L. Cook Public Library – Waynesville
 Mason Public Library - Mason
 Salem Township Public Library - Morrow
 Springboro Public Library - Springboro

Transportation

Highways

  Interstate 71
  Interstate 75
  U.S. Route 22
  U.S. Route 42
  State Route 3
  State Route 28
  State Route 48
  State Route 63
  State Route 73
  State Route 122
  State Route 123
  State Route 132
  State Route 350
  State Route 741

Airports
Warren County has one public airport, designated as Lebanon-Warren County Airport (I68). The runway is a 4502' x 65' paved and lighted North-South runway (01/19), and parallel taxiway. Navigation and communications equipment includes PAPI, AWOS, Pilot Controlled Lighting, and UNICOM. The airport runway, taxiway, and navigation equipment is owned by the County. The county leases a public terminal, but other facilities are privately owned and operated under contract by a Fixed-base operator. The airport serves general and business aviation, but has no commercial airlines.

There are also two privately owned operating airports in the county; Waynesville airport, also known as Red Stewart Field (40I), and Caesar Creek Gliderport (2OH9), both with grass runways. Operations have ceased at two former private paved runway airports, Brownie's Lebanon Airport (19I), and Lebanon San Mar Gale (OH79).

Rail and Bus
Warren County does not have passenger train service except for a scenic train that runs between Lebanon and Mason. Freight trains still serve Carlisle, and on a limited basis, Monroe, Mason, and Lebanon. Historically, there have been several trains that ran through the county whose stops became cities and villages. These trains include the Cincinnati, Lebanon and Northern Railway, the Middletown and Cincinnati Railroad, and the Little Miami Railroad whose path is now replaced by the Little Miami Bike Trail. There have been proposals to run commuter trains from Cincinnati to the Kings Island area, but none have ever found sufficient support or funding.

There is no public bus transportation based in Warren County, but there is limited service from Cincinnati to Mason and Kings Island. Middletown also runs bus service to eastern portions of Middletown that are in Warren County.

Waterways
There are no commercially navigable waterways in Warren County, but the Warren County Canal did operate in the 19th century as a branch of the Miami and Erie Canal, bringing freight to Lebanon by canal boat. Recreationally, the Little Miami River can be traveled by canoe or kayak for its length through the county, and motorized boating can be done at Caesar's Creek Lake.

Media

The Journal-News circulates in Franklin, Springboro, Lebanon, and Turtlecreek Township. The Dayton Daily News, circulates in the northern part of the county. The Cincinnati Enquirer circulates through most of the county while the Cincinnati Post abandoned all distribution in the county in 2004.

Among its weekly papers was The Western Star, the oldest weekly in the state and the oldest newspaper west of the Appalachians published under its original name. It was closed on January 17, 2013. The Star, like the Pulse-Journal in Mason and the Star-Press in Springboro, was owned by the parent of the Middletown Journal and the Dayton Daily News, Cox Media Group. Other weeklies include the Franklin Chronicle.

For a time in the mid-1990s, Lebanon was the home of commercial radio station WMMA-FM, begun by Mike and Marilyn McMurray in 1994. The McMurrays sold to what was then known as American Radio Systems License Corp. a Boston-based chain of stations which also owned Cincinnati stations WGRR-FM and WKRQ (both since sold to various other owners). The new owners moved the station to Hamilton County. In 2010, the only radio station in the county at the time was WLMH-FM, a student-run station at Little Miami High School in Hamilton Township. It went off the air around 2010, and in 2012, the FCC removed WLMH from their database and cancelled their license as a result of no broadcasts for over a year.

Warren County is assigned to the Cincinnati television market, but Dayton television stations treat it as part of their market as well.

Recreation and attractions
 Kings Island: Theme park
 Western & Southern Open: Professional tennis tournament
 The Beach Water Park: Outdoor water park
 Great Wolf Lodge: Indoor water park resort
 Ozone Zipline Adventures: Ziplines ranging from 250 feet to 1300 feet
 Lebanon Mason Monroe Railroad: Nostalgic, themed train rides
 Fort Ancient: American Indian earthen mounds
 Caesar Creek State Park and Caesar Creek Lake
 Caesar's Creek Pioneer Village
 Little Miami Scenic Trail: Scenic bike trail
 Lebanon Countryside Trail
 The Golden Lamb: Ohio's oldest continuously operating inn
 La Comedia Dinner Theatre: Professional dinner theater
 Morgan's Canoe Livery: Canoe rental on Little Miami National Scenic River
 Bella Balloons & Gentle Breeze Balloons: Balloon sightseeing tours
 Vertical Advantage Helicopters: Helicopter sightseeing tours
 Start Skydiving: Skydiving
 Red Stewart Airfield: Airplane sightseeing tours from a grass-strip airfield
 Cincinnati AVP Open: Professional beach volleyball tournament
 Warren County Historical Society Museum
 Glendower State Memorial
 Lebanon Raceway
 Ohio Renaissance Festival
 Lebanon Horse-Drawn Carriage Parade & Festival
 The Christmas Ranch

Communities

Cities
 Carlisle (part)
 Franklin
 Lebanon (county seat)
 Loveland (part)
 Mason
 Middletown (part)
 Monroe (part)
 Springboro (part)

Villages

 Blanchester (part)
 Butlerville
 Corwin
 Harveysburg
 Maineville
 Morrow
 Pleasant Plain
 South Lebanon
 Waynesville

Townships

 Clearcreek
 Deerfield
 Franklin
 Hamilton
 Harlan
 Massie
 Salem
 Turtlecreek
 Union
 Washington
 Wayne

https://web.archive.org/web/20160715023447/http://www.ohiotownships.org/township-websites

Census-designated places
 Five Points
 Hunter
 Kings Mills
 Landen
 Loveland Park

Unincorporated communities

 Beedles Station
 Blackhawk
 Blue Ball (a neighborhood of Middletown)
 Brown's Store
 Cozaddale
 Crosswick
 Dallasburg
 Dodds
 Edwardsville
 Fort Ancient
 Fosters
 Genn Town
 Greentree Corners
 Hagemans Crossing
 Hammel
 Hillcrest
 Henpeck
 Hicks
 Hopkinsville
 Kenricksville
 Level
 Mathers Mill
 Middleboro
 Mount Holly
 Murdoch
 Oregonia
 Pekin
 Red Lion
 Roachester
 Rossburg
 Ridgeville
 San Mar Gale
 Socialville
 Twenty Mile Stand
 Union Village
 Utica
 Zoar

Notable natives and residents
 Neil Armstrong, Astronaut
 Robert Benham, Pioneer politician
 Clarence Brown, Jr., Congressman
 John Chivington, Civil War officer
 Thomas Corwin, Governor
 Brant Daugherty, Actor
 William H. P. Denny, Newspaper publisher
 Clifford B. Harmon, Aviator
 Woody Harrelson, Actor
 Cordell Hull, Secretary of State
 Bruce E. Ivins, Scientist
 Michael Larson, Game-show contestant
 Donald Lukens, Congressman
 William C. McClintock, Newspaper publisher
 John McLean, U.S. Supreme Court justice
 Jeremiah Morrow, Governor
 Marcus Mote, Early Ohio Artist
 Anthony Muñoz, NFL player
 Corwin M. Nixon, Ohio State Representative (1962-1992), Ohio House of Representatives Minority Leader (1979-1992)
 Dan Patrick, Sports broadcaster
 Marty Roe, Musician
 Thomas Ross, Congressman
 Larry Sparks, Musician
 Wilson E. Terry, Spanish–American War soldier
 Durbin Ward, Civil War general
 Mark Whitacre, FBI informant, Inspiration for the book and movie The Informant!
 Joseph Whitehill, Ohio state treasurer
 Steve Wilson, Ohio State Senator

See also

Historical articles about Warren County
 Cincinnati, Lebanon and Northern Railway
 Little Miami Railroad
 Middletown and Cincinnati Railroad
 National Register of Historic Places listings in Warren County, Ohio
 Warren County Canal

State facilities in Warren County
 Lebanon Correctional Institution
 Warren Correctional Institution
 Ohio Department of Transportation District 8 headquarters

References

Further reading
 Elva R. Adams. Warren County Revisited. Lebanon, Ohio: Warren County Historical Society, 1989.
 Robert Brenner. Maineville, Ohio, History: 100 Years as an Incorporated Town, 1850–1950. Cincinnati: John S. Swift, 1950.
 The Centennial Atlas of Warren County, Ohio. Lebanon, Ohio: The Centennial Atlas Association, 1903.
 Mabel Eldridge and Dudley Bryant. Franklin in the Great Miami Valley. Edited by Harriet E. Foley. Franklin, Ohio: Franklin Area Historical Society, 1982.
 Harriet E. Foley, editor. Carlisle: The Jersey Settlement in Ohio, 1800–1990. 2nd ed. Carlisle, Ohio: The Editor, 1990.
 Josiah Morrow. The History of Warren County, Ohio. Chicago: W.H. Beers, 1883. (Reprinted several times)
 Ohio Atlas & Gazetteer. 6th ed. Yarmouth, Maine: DeLorme, 2001. 
 Thomas D. Schiffer. Peters & King: The Birth & Evolution of the Peters Cartridge Co. & the King Powder Co. Iola, Wisconsin: Krause Publications, 2002. 
 William E. Smith. History of Southwestern Ohio: The Miami Valleys. New York: Lewis Historical Publishing, 1964. 3 vols.
 Rose Marie Springman. Around Mason, Ohio: A Story. Mason, Ohio: The Author, 1982.
 Warren County Engineer's Office. Official Highway Map 2003. Lebanon, Ohio: The Office, 2003.

External links
 Official county site
 Quick facts – US Census
 Warren County Convention & Visitors Bureau
 Warren County Historical Society
 Series of articles on local history written by Dallas Bogen
 Warren County genealogical information

 
1803 establishments in Ohio
Populated places established in 1803